The Eternal Castle Remastered is an adventure, platform game developed by Leonard Menchiari and released in 2019. It was released for Microsoft Windows, Nintendo Switch, PlayStation 4, and PlayStation 5. Set in a far future, the game follows a colonist whose ship crashes on Earth during an attempt to flee the planet. The game is a faux remaster of a non-existent 1987 game, The Eternal Castle.

Reception 

The Eternal Castle received generally positive reviews.

See also 
 Riot

References

External links 
 Official website
 
 

2019 video games
Indie video games
Windows games
MacOS games
Linux games
PlayStation 4 games
PlayStation 5 games
Nintendo Switch games
Video games developed in Italy
Single-player video games